Damn Yankees was the self titled debut album by the American hard rock supergroup Damn Yankees. It was certified double platinum in the US and featured such chart topping hits as "High Enough", "Come Again", and "Coming of Age".

Music
The first single, "Coming of Age", a traditional guitar-driven song, gained heavy airplay on rock radio, reaching No. 60 on the US Billboard Hot 100 chart.

Track listing
All songs written by Jack Blades, Ted Nugent and Tommy Shaw

 "Coming of Age" – 4:21
 "Bad Reputation" – 4:29
 "Runaway" – 4:02
 "High Enough" – 4:43
 "Damn Yankees" – 4:37
 "Come Again" – 5:38
 "Mystified" – 4:14
 "Rock City" – 4:28
 "Tell Me How You Want It" – 4:32
 "Piledriver" – 4:18

Personnel

Band members
 Tommy Shaw – guitar, vocals
 Ted Nugent – guitar and vocals
 Jack Blades – bass guitar, vocals
 Michael Cartellone – drums

Additional musicians
Alan Pasqua – Hammond organ
Neverleave Brothers – backing vocals
Jimmie Haskell – string arrangements, conductor

Production
Ron Nevison – producer, engineer
Pre–production at Soundscape Studios, New York, Prairie Sun Recording Studios, Cotati and Blades Ranch, Sonoma County, California 
Tucker Williamson, Franck Derner – assistance at Blades Ranch
John Aguto, Ed Goodreau, Bill Kennedy – assistant engineers at A&M Studios
Toby Wright, Jeff Poe – assistant engineers at Can-Am Recorders
John Kalodner – A&R

Charts

Album

Singles

Certifications

References

External links
Heavy Harmonies page

1990 debut albums
Damn Yankees (band) albums
Albums arranged by Jimmie Haskell
Albums produced by Ron Nevison
Warner Records albums
Albums recorded at A&M Studios